Logsdon is a surname. Notable people with the surname include:

Gene Logsdon (1931–2016), American author, critic and farmer
Jimmie Logsdon (1922–2001), American country and rockabilly singer-songwriter
John Logsdon, American political scientist
Joseph Logsdon (1938–1999), American historian
Mayme Logsdon (1881–1967), American mathematician
Val Logsdon Fitch (1923–2015), American nuclear physicist

See also
Logsdon Seminary